Juan Alberto Cohen Sander (14 June 1960,) is a Dominican economist, politician, businessman, and member of parliament. He was a presidential candidate of the Dominican Republic by the National Citizen Will Party (PNVC) for the general election 2016.

Early life and education 
Cohen was born on 14 June 1960 in Santo Domingo, Dominican Republic. He studied economics at Pedro Henríquez Ureña University. He earned a Master of Economics at the Pontifical Catholic University Mother and Teacher and studied Political Science at the University Pedro Henríquez Ureña.

He completed postgraduate degrees in finance at Hult International Business School (then known as Arthur D. Little School of Management) and business management at Harvard University.

Career 
Sander served as President of the Commission of Tourism and deputy of the Central American Parliament from 2010–2016. In 2014, he was reelected as President of the National Citizen Will Party (PNVC) and in March 2015, was elect presidential candidate by the PNVC, in the XXXVII National Assembly Extraordinary.

Additional affiliations 
From 2008 - 2014, Sander served as president of the Dominican Federation of Golf, where he executed important contributions to the development of golf in the Dominican Republic (2008–2014). He has also handled important media in the Dominican Republic.

Personal life 
Cohen is married to María Marmolejos since 1985, with whom he has 3 children: Manuel Alberto, Juan Alberto and María de Dios.

References 

1960 births
Living people
Dominican Republic economists
Presidents of political parties in the Dominican Republic
Candidates for President of the Dominican Republic
Hult International Business School alumni
People from Santo Domingo
Dominican Republic people of Spanish descent
Dominican Republic people of Jewish descent
Dominican Republic people of Irish descent
White Dominicans